The Mummy and the Humming Bird is a lost 1915 American drama silent film directed by James Durkin and written by Isaac Henderson. The film stars Charles Cherry, Lillian Tucker, Arthur Hoops, William Sorelle, Claire Zobelle and Charles Coleman. The film was released on November 11, 1915, by Paramount Pictures.

Plot

Cast 
Charles Cherry as Lord Lumley
Lillian Tucker as Lady Lumley
Arthur Hoops as Signor D'Orelli
William Sorelle as Giuseppe
Claire Zobelle as Emma
Charles Coleman as	Ronalds
Nina Lindsey as Ruth

References

External links 
 

1915 films
1910s English-language films
Silent American drama films
1915 drama films
Paramount Pictures films
American black-and-white films
Lost American films
American silent feature films
1915 lost films
Lost drama films
1910s American films